John Caswell Davis (August 19, 1888 – October 25, 1953) was a Canadian senator.

Biography

Early career
Born in Montreal, Quebec in 1888 and after graduating from McGill University with a degree in civil engineering he moved to Saint Boniface, Manitoba where his bilingual Montreal upbringing fostered quick assimilation into the local French and Metis culture.

Political career
Bilingual and bicultural, John Caswell Davis's political abilities were appreciated as a bridge to unify a French minority intent on asserting itself culturally and politically within a Canada dominated by the English majority.  Member of the Liberal Party and gifted orator John Caswell Davis entered the senate in 1949. His promising political career was cut short by his untimely death in 1953 while only 65 years old.

Other work
Caswell Davis was a gifted, inspired, and prolific artist who worked in numerous media including pencil, pen and ink, watercolour, and pastels. His landscapes captured the changing and often vanishing natural beauty of the forests, prairie, and mountains of western Canada. His cityscapes are low key but very revealing explorations of a Canadian society in process of urbanisation after centuries of rural existence. As a draughtsman, his linear ability was used in the documentation of the everyday life of French Canada and his adopted home St. Boniface. Adept at representation, his numerous portraits of friends and family members demonstrate a brilliance in capturing and revealing the personality and inner character of the subject. His numerous journeys to London and Paris made him aware of the fervent that contemporary European art was experiencing. While never addressing 20th-century modernism, Caswell Davis drew inspiration from the 19th century concerns of painters such as Millet and the Barbizon School's commitment to landscape the portrayal of more humble members of society. Individuals from all stations of life were C D's subjects, including prime ministers and politicians, wealthy and famous, colourful voyageurs and trappers, members of first nation Canada, humble farmers, tradesmen, merchants, and housekeepers. A first rate draughtsman and brilliant caricaturist who drew inspiration from Daumier and the 19th-century tradition of satire and political cartoon, much of his best work involved an understated and quiet portrayal of the ironic and humorous spectacle of everyday experience.  He was also deeply committed to the documentation of vanishing Aboriginal Canada. His fondness and fascination for native culture resulted in numerous portraits that he executed while attending and participating in pow wows and tribal gatherings all over Canada.

Personal life
He married Priscilla Emmerling Guilbault (1896 - 1973) in approximately 1916 (Emmerlings and Guilbaults were peripherally involved in the Riel Rebellion) and their union produced four children: James Edward Joseph (1919–2003); Yvonne (b. 1921); Lucille (1923–1995); and Patricia (1931–2012).

External links
 

1888 births
1953 deaths
20th-century Canadian painters
Anglophone Quebec people
Artists from Montreal
Canadian male painters
Canadian senators from Manitoba
Liberal Party of Canada senators
McGill University Faculty of Engineering alumni
Politicians from Montreal
20th-century Canadian male artists